This is a list of places named after Horatio Nelson (Lord Nelson) (1758-1805), the British admiral.

Populated places 
Fort Nelson, British Columbia, Canada
Nelson, New Zealand
 Nelson, Lancashire, England, named after a public house, itself named after Lord Nelson
Nelson, Caerphilly, Wales, a village named after a public house, itself named after Lord Nelson
Nelson, New Hampshire
Nelson, New York

Geographic features 
Mount Nelson, British Columbia, Canada
Nelson Head, Northwest Territories, Canada
Nelson Island (British Columbia), Canada
Nelson's Island, Egypt

Historic sites 
Nelson's Dockyard, Antigua
Lord Nelson Hotel, Halifax, Nova Scotia, Canada
Fort Nelson, Hampshire, England
Nelson Place West, Bath, England
Nelson Garden, Monmouth, Wales
Belmond Mount Nelson Hotel Cape Town, South Africa
 Nelson Hügel (Nelson Hill) Vockerode, Saxony-Anhalt, Germany
Horatio Nelson
Nelson